Jamalapuram is a small village located near to Errupalem, a town in the Khammam district of Telangana, India. The village has a population of more than 3000 people. Its main landmark is a temple dedicated to Venkateswara.

Lord Sri Venkateswara Swamy Temple in Jamalapuram is very famous temple in Khammam District and Telangana. Here Lord Venkateswara as "Swayam Bhoo".Pilgrims Calls it as Telangana Tirupathi.  There are Sri Padmavathi Amma vari Temple, Sri Alivelu Amma vari Temple, Sivalayam, Ganesh Temple, Anjaneya Swamy temple and Ayyappa Swmay Temple also here.  The Temple and Jamalapuram surroundings are very pleasant weather with green hills.

References 

Villages in Khammam district